The Human Centipede 3 (Final Sequence) is a 2015 English-language Dutch black comedy body horror film written and directed by Tom Six. It is the conclusion to Six's The Human Centipede trilogy. 
Starring Dieter Laser and Laurence R. Harvey, the leading actors from the first two films, in new roles, The Human Centipede 3 was released both theatrically and on video on demand on 22 May 2015. The film was slammed with negative reviews from critics due to its overwhelming gore and repetitive plot to its predecessors.

Plot
At George H. W. Bush State Prison in Southwestern United States, William "Bill" Boss, a cannibalistic, psychopathic warden, watches the end of The Human Centipede 2 (Full Sequence) with his accountant, Dwight Butler.

Bill receives a threatening prank phone call from an inmate. Bill waterboards him with three buckets of boiling water as punishment, horribly disfiguring him. Governor Hughes arrives, ordering Bill and Dwight to put a stop to the violence and promising that they will both be fired otherwise. In anger and retaliation, Bill orders a mass castration of the inmates, and castrates one of the prisoners himself, then cooks and eats the testicles for "energy food."

Dwight pitches an idea to fix the prison's horrible retention and violence rates to Bill: Suture all of the inmates together mouth-to-anus, forming a giant human centipede, which would be the ultimate deterrent to crime. Bill is skeptical and opposed to the idea. Bill then has a nightmare about being attacked by inmates, and raped by the inmate he castrated. Bill then summons the director of The Human Centipede 2, Tom Six, to the prison. Bill is assured that the films are "100% medically accurate." Six gives the prison permission to use his Centipede idea, provided that he is permitted to witness the operation. The first two films are then shown to the inmates as a display of their future. This causes a riot. Inmates chase Bill and Dwight to the warden's office, where they beat his assistant Daisy unconscious.

Bill goes around each cell and shoots every inmate with tranquilizers, readying them for the operation. Incompatible inmates are shot and killed. They discover an inmate with Crohn's disease, who suffers from severe diarrhea. Bill orders the man who raped him in the dream to be attached to him as an added punishment. Daisy is in a coma, where she is raped by Bill. Six returns to the prison, where he is met by Bill and Dwight. After touring the cells, they discover a mentally unstable inmate eating his own feces wanting to be sewn to the centipede. Bill shoots and kills the inmate, as he does not want anyone to enjoy the punishment.

Upon the centipede's completion, Governor Hughes arrives greatly disgusted at what he sees. In addition to the centipede, a "Human Caterpillar" has been created by suturing together death row inmates, along with those who were given a life sentence, and amputating their limbs. Daisy has accidentally been sewn into the Centipede. Hughes leaves the prison, telling Dwight and Bill they should receive the death penalty.

Hughes then returns to prison with a sudden change of heart, stating that the Centipede punishment is "exactly what America needs." Dwight and Bill celebrate their success. Dwight is then shot and killed for trying to take credit for the idea. A naked Bill screams with joy, overlooking the centipede.

In an alternate ending, Doctor Josef Heiter lays in his bed, implying that the previous events were part of a dream. He finds his three rottweilers, his first centipede creation, deceased. The camera pans over his house and the film transitions into the beginning of The Human Centipede (First Sequence).

Cast
 Dieter Laser as Bill Boss
 Laurence R. Harvey as Dwight Butler
 Robert LaSardo as Inmate 297
 Tommy "Tiny" Lister, Jr. as Inmate 178
 Jay Tavare as Inmate 346
 Eric Roberts as Governor Hughes
 Bree Olson as Daisy
 Clayton Rohner as Dr. Jones
 Tom Six as Himself
 Hamzah Saman as Inmate 093
 Peter Blankenstein as Inmate 106
 Carlos Ramirez as Inmate 309
 Bill Hutchens as Inmate 488
 Chris Clanton as Prisoner
 Akihiro Kitamura as Inmate 333
 Basil Firea as Inmate 310
 Daniel TwoFeathers as Stabbed Prison Guard

Production
Six noted that casting for the third film was much easier than the first, as more people were familiar with the concept and wanted to appear in the film. To this end, Eric Roberts was easier to attract to the film, because according to Six, he was a fan of the original. Six decided to cast porn actress Bree Olson because he wanted a female character, even though the movie was set in an all-male prison, and wanted "the ultimate American female," which he believed to be a porn actress. Both Laser and Harvey had starred in previous entries as the main antagonists, Dr. Josef Heiter and Martin, respectively.

Six chose a prison setting to bring back the theme of "punishment" that generated the idea for the series, although Six admits that "I totally ignored [it] in the first two films." Six filmed the movie in the style of "a Hollywood film," which according to him meant shooting "everything widescreen with over-the-top color grading and big Hollywood music," after receiving encouragement to do so from film festivals audiences Six noted that this helped bring out how "ridiculous" the concept was.

Six has stated that some of the crew members did not agree to put their full names in the credits, and adding these same members did not have such reservations about the second part. In order to promote the film, Six distributed 250 hand-signed prints of the film in March 2015.

Release
On 7 April 2015, Entertainment Weekly announced the film's theatrical and video on demand release date to be 22 May 2015.

The film passed uncut in Australia on 6 May, with an R18+ rating, and screened in a national tour throughout June, with Harvey appearing as a special guest. The film was released on DVD and Blu-ray in Australia on 22 July 2015.

Despite controversy over the second film in the franchise, the film passed uncut in the UK with an 18 certificate and in New Zealand with an R18 certificate. It was released in the UK on 20 July.

Critical reception
The Human Centipede 3 has received generally negative reviews from critics. On review aggregate website Rotten Tomatoes, the film has an 20% rating based on 46 reviews with an average rating of 2.2/10. The site's critical consensus states that "Human Centipede fans may find enough extreme body horror in the third installment to satisfy, but filmgoers of every other persuasion are strongly advised to stay far, far away from Final Sequence." Metacritic reports an average score of 5 out of 100, indicating "overwhelming dislike" from 15 critics.

Entertainment Weekly ranked the film as the second worst movie of 2015, specifying, "sleazy sadism served with a wink and a smile, Six’s anus-to-mouth trilogy is a satire without any clue of what it’s satirizing." Additionally, The A.V. Club also ranked the film as the second worst of 2015, declaring, "Writer-director Tom Six lives for disapproval, and he’s finally made a movie that basically no one—not even those amused or unnerved by the past two installments—could possibly enjoy."

In his review for Variety, Dennis Harvey noted, "As with earlier chapters, the packaging is as competent (if not particularly inspired) as the content is remedial. Indeed, perhaps the series' only really good joke has been the inherent absurdism of seeing an ever-rising level of expense, polish and now "name" actors applied to something so fundamentally dumb." Eddie Goldberger of New York Daily News concluded his review with, "The movie passes time until it can get to the centipeding. Even the big namesake event, when it finally arrives, is ho-hum. Turns out, whether it’s three people stuck together or 500, if you’ve seen one human centipede, you’ve seen them all."

The New York Times critic Jeannette Catsoulis said of the film, "An ugly, claustrophobic celebration of sexual violence that’s anchored by one of the most repellent characters ever to appear on screen: the prison warden Bill Boss. Portrayed by Dieter Laser, Boss is a capering obscenity whose oft-protruding tongue deserves its own agent."

Greg Cwik of Indiewire gave the film a C- and said: "Final Sequence is too self-serious to be camp, but too silly to be scary, so Six just settles for gross."

Home media
The Human Centipede 3 (Final Sequence) was released on DVD and Blu-ray on 27 October 2015 in the United States. Additionally, a Blu-ray box set containing all of the films was released on the same day.

Accolades

At the Golden Raspberry Award, this movie was nominated as Worst Prequel, Remake, Rip-off or Sequel and its director, Tom Six, was nominated as Worst Director.

Parody
Bree Olson starred in a parody of the feature that was directed by Graham Rich and shot in Hollywood, California.

References

External links

2015 films
2010s comedy horror films
2010s black comedy films
2015 horror films
Dutch horror films
English-language Dutch films
Dutch black comedy films
Body horror films
Color sequels of black-and-white films
Films about films
Films directed by Tom Six
Films set in the United States
Metafictional works
2010s prison films
Splatter films
Splatterpunk
Dutch sequel films
2010s English-language films